Thaumatopsis fieldella is a moth in the family Crambidae. It was described by William Barnes and James Halliday McDunnough in 1912. It is found in North America, where it has been recorded from California.

References

Crambini
Moths described in 1912
Moths of North America